The Regius Professor of Surgery is a Regius professorship held at the University of Aberdeen. The position was created by Queen Victoria in 1839 and was originally a professorship at Marischal College, until it amalgamated with King's College in 1860 to become the University of Aberdeen.

Holders
 1839-1882 William Pirie
 1882-1909 Alexander Ogston
 1910-1932 Sir John Marnoch
 1932-1938 James Learmonth
 1939-1962 William Wilson
 1962-1982 George Smith
 1985-1998 Oleg Eremin
 2000–present James Hutchison

Footnotes

Surgery
1839 establishments in Scotland
Surgery
Professorships in medicine